Mata Ayer is a state constituency in Perlis, Malaysia, that has been represented in the Perlis State Legislative Assembly from 1959 to 1974 and from 1995 to present.

The state constituency was first contested in 1959 and is mandated to return a single Assemblyman to the Perlis State Legislative Assembly under the first-past-the-post voting system. , the State Assemblywoman for Mata Ayer is Siti Berenee Yahaya from Barisan Nasional (BN).

Definition

Polling districts 
According to the federal gazette issued on 31 October 2022, the Maya Ayer constituency is divided into 3 polling districts.

Demographics

Representation history

Election results

References

Perlis state constituencies